

Given name 
M. Dayne Aldridge, former Dean of the School of Engineering at Mercer University
Dayne Beams (born 1990), professional Australian rules football player
Dayne Crist (born 1989), American football quarterback
Dayne Kelly (born 1990), Australian tennis player
Dayne Kinnaird (born 1982), motocross rider for Zoo York Skateboard Company
Dayne Pratzky, Australian anti-fracking activist
Dayne Robertson (born 1988), Scottish football midfielder
Dayne Sherman (born 1970), American writer of fiction and journalism
Dayne Walling (born 1974), mayor of Flint, Michigan
Dayne Wescott (1850–1929), member of the Wisconsin State Senate
Dayne Weston (born 1986), Australian rugby league player
Dayne Zorko (born 1989), professional Australian rules football player

Surname 
Bella Dayne, German actress
Blanche Dayne (1871–1944), American vaudeville actress
Ron Dayne (born 1978), former American college and professional football player
Taylor Dayne (born 1962), American pop and freestyle music singer-songwriter and actress

See also
Dayné Peak, a distinctive pyramidal peak northeast of Cape Errera, the southwest tip of Wiencke Island, in the Palmer Archipelago
Dayne Ogilvie Prize, Canadian literary award
Daynes
Dane (disambiguation)
Daye (disambiguation)
Dwayne
Dyne, a CGS unit of force